Walter Stanley "Dinty" Moore (September 30, 1903 - April 1978) was a professional football player from New York City. He attended and played college football for Lafayette College and made his National Football League debut in 1927 with the Pottsville Maroons. He played only one season for the Maroons before ending his NFL career.

References

1903 births
1978 deaths
Lafayette Leopards football players
Pottsville Maroons players
Millville Football & Athletic Club players